Ravi Thakur (born 15 December 1997) is an Indian cricketer. He made his first-class debut for Himachal Pradesh in the 2016–17 Ranji Trophy on 29 November 2016. He made his List A debut for Himachal Pradesh in the 2016–17 Vijay Hazare Trophy on 1 March 2017. He made his Twenty20 debut on 10 January 2021, for Himachal Pradesh in the 2020–21 Syed Mushtaq Ali Trophy.

References

External links
 

1997 births
Living people
Indian cricketers
Himachal Pradesh cricketers
People from Mandi, Himachal Pradesh